Immaculate Heart High School may refer to:

Immaculate Heart High School (Arizona), Oro Valley, Arizona
Immaculate Heart High School (Los Angeles), Los Angeles, California